Ladies Crave Excitement is a 1935 American action–comedy drama film released by Mascot Pictures, directed by Nick Grinde and starring Norman Foster, Evalyn Knapp and Esther Ralston.

Plot 
Don Phelan, the ace newsreel reporter, falls in love with Wilma Howell, the daughter of the owner of another newsreel company that is a bitter rival of the one Don works for. The rivalry, with cameramen jostling each other out of the way, acts of sabotage, and reporters fighting to get the 'scoop', does not bode well for the romance.

Cast

Soundtrack

Release
Ladies Crave Excitement was released on DVD on July 26, 2010. The film was again released on DVD on August 27, 2013.

References

External links 

1935 films
1930s action comedy-drama films
1930s romantic comedy-drama films
1930s war comedy-drama films
American black-and-white films
American action comedy-drama films
American romantic comedy-drama films
American war comedy-drama films
1930s English-language films
Films about journalists
Films directed by Nick Grinde
Mascot Pictures films
Films produced by Nat Levine
1935 comedy films
1935 drama films
1930s American films